The 1987–88 season was Chelsea Football Club's seventy-fourth competitive season.

Table

References

External links
 1987–88 season at stamford-bridge.com

1987–88
English football clubs 1987–88 season